The following lists events that happened during 1843 in Australia.

Incumbents

Governors
Governors of the Australian colonies:
Governor of New South Wales – Sir George Gipps
Governor of South Australia – Sir George Grey
Governor of Tasmania – Captain Sir John Franklin
Governor of Western Australia as a Crown Colony – John Hutt.

Events
 The Argyle Cut in The Rocks is started, using convict labour, it is completed in 1864, using free labourers.
 12 September – The Battle of One Tree Hill was a conflict between European settlers and aboriginals.

Science and technology
 September – John Ridley builds his invention, a corn stripper-harvester, in Hindmarsh.

Births

 11 January – C. Y. O'Connor, engineer (born in Ireland) (d. 1902)
 2 May – James Garvan, New South Wales politician (born in Ireland) (d. 1896)
 6 July – Sir John Downer, 16th Premier of South Australia (d. 1915)
 24 July – Nathaniel Dawes, bishop (born in the United Kingdom) (d. 1910)
 27 July – Joseph Vardon, South Australian politician and printer (d. 1913)
 24 August – Boyd Dunlop Morehead, 10th Premier of Queensland (d. 1905)
 26 September – Joseph Furphy, author and poet (d. 1912)
 1 October – Garnet Walch, writer, journalist and publisher (d. 1913)
 9 October – Alexander William Jardine, engineer (d. 1920)
 5 November – Sir Harry Rawson, 21st Governor of New South Wales (born in the United Kingdom) (d. 1910)
 25 December – Edward Ellis Morris, lexicographer and educationist (born in India) (d. 1902)
 28 December – Ebenezer Wake Cook, artist (born in the United Kingdom) (d. 1926)

Deaths
 22 December – John Bigge, judge and royal commissioner (born and died in the United Kingdom) (b. 1780)

References

 
Australia
Years of the 19th century in Australia